Dr. Ev4l is the second studio album by American rapper Young Nudy. It was released on May 18, 2021, via Young Nudy LLC under exclusive license to RCA Records. Production was handled by Coupe, 20 Rocket, Mahd Mclaren, Mojo Krazy, Bavier On The Beat, and Forthenight. It features guest appearances from 21 Savage, G Herbo and Lil Uzi Vert. The album debuted at number 93 on the US Billboard 200.

Track listing

Charts

References

2021 albums
Young Nudy albums